Chortiheros wesseli, is a species of cichlid found in Middle America. It is endemic to fast-flowing waters of the Río Papaloteca, Río Cangrejal and Río Danto in the northern Caribbean coast of Honduras. This species is the only known member of its genus.

References

Heroini
Taxa named by Robert Rush Miller
Monotypic fish genera
Fish described in 1996